Oral Baigonysuly Muhamedjanov (Oral Baiğonysūly Mūhamedjanov; 11 November 1948 – 15 October 2013) was a Kazakh politician, member of the Mazhilis from 2004 to 2013, and the chair of Mazhilis from 2004 to 2007 and then from 2008 to 2012.

Biography

Early life and education 
Muhamedjanov was born in 1948 in the city of Kostanay to the parents of Muhamedjanov Baygonys (1915–1994) and Muhamedjanova Biken (1926–1955). In 1971, he graduated from the Novosibirsk Institute of Cooperative Trade and then in Alma-Ata Higher Party School in 1980.

Career 
From 1971 to 1975 he worked in the city of Kostanay in a Regional Consumer Union, worsted-cloth factory. From 1975 to 1992 he worked in various positions in the Komsomol and party bodies, in the Regional Council of People's Deputies of the Torgai Region. From 1992 to 1994 he was the head of the Amangeldy District Administration.

In 1994, Muhamedjanov became a deputy chairman of the Committee on Economic Reform of the Supreme Soviet of the 13th convocation. From 1995 to 1997, he was the head of the Department of Social and Cultural Development of the Office of the Government of the Republic of Kazakhstan.

From 1997 to 2004 he worked in the Administration of the President of Kazakhstan, having gone from a state inspector to the head of the Department of organizational and control work.

In the 2004 legislative election held in September 2004, Muhamedjanov was elected to the Mazhilis and was its chair from November 2004 to September 2007. In August 2007, he was re-elected for a second term and became a member of the Committee on Agricultural Issues. On 11 February 2008, Muhamedjanov was chosen to be the parliamentary leader of the Nur Otan. On 13 October 2008, he was chosen to be the chair again until the dissolution of the Mazhilis on 16 November 2011. After the 2012 Kazakh legislative election, Muhamedjanov a member of the Committee on Foreign Affairs, Defense and Security, while Nurlan Nigmatulin succeeded him as the chair of the Mazhilis.

Death 
Muhamedjanov died on 15 October 2013 at the age of 64.

References

1948 births
2013 deaths
Chairmen of the Mazhilis
Members of the Mazhilis